Priozerny is a rural locality (a settlement) and the administrative center of Priozyorny Selsoviet, Ust-Kalmansky District, Altai Krai, Russia. The population was 371 as of 2013. There are 9 streets.

Geography 
Priozerny is located 15 km east of Ust-Kalmanka (the district's administrative centre) by road. Ust-Kalmanka is the nearest rural locality.

References 

Rural localities in Ust-Kalmansky District